Esquire Magazine (UK edition) is a monthly men's magazine originally owned by the National Magazine Company (since 2011, following a merger, renamed Hearst Magazines UK), a subsidiary of the US-based Hearst Corporation. The first edition was published Spring/Summer 1991.

The magazine features articles on luxe design and culture, food, business and technology, style, music and books. It is pitched at a similarly upscale audience to GQ, attempting to offer a more adult read than lad mags like Maxim and FHM.

Each month, Esquire Magazine features famous celebrities on its cover: cover girls have included Katy Perry and Rachel Weisz; and male celebrities from Jeff Bridges and Jake Gyllenhaal to Dizzee Rascal have appeared on the cover. The first cover star was Brigitte Bardot.

Editors 
The current editor is Alex Bilmes.

 2011 – present: Alex Bilmes
 August 2007 – September 2010: Jeremy Langmead
 May 2003 – August 2007: Simon Tiffin
 March 1997 – March 2003: Peter Howarth
 February 1992 – January 1997: Rosie Boycott
 October 1990 – January 1992: Alex Finer

References

External links 
 Esquire UK

1991 establishments in the United Kingdom
Men's magazines published in the United Kingdom
Monthly magazines published in the United Kingdom
Esquire (magazine)
Magazines established in 1991